Huayllayoc (possibly from Quechua waylla meadow, -yuq a suffix to indicate ownership, "the one with a meadow") is a mountain in the Chila in the Andes of Peru, about  high. It is located in the Arequipa Region, Castilla Province, Chachas District. Huayllayoc lies at the river Cacamayo (possibly from Quechua for "rock river") which later is named Collpamayo (possibly from Quechua for "salpeter river"). Its waters flow to the Colca River.

References

Mountains of Peru
Mountains of Arequipa Region